By The People is a 2005 Indian Malayalam-language vigilante thriller film directed by Jayaraj and starring Narain. It is the sequel of 4 the People (2004) and the prequel of Of the People (2008). The film marks the debut of Surabhi Lakshmi.

Synopsis 
Two years after the events in 4 the People, Superintendent of police Rajan Mathew (Narain) is working an administrative job after being dismissed and transferred for killing Vivek among the 4 the people group. A group of students, inspired by 4 the people, form a more aggressive team to fight corruption by resorting to killing corrupt individuals, their group being named "By the people". The group are actually college students in a band named Pulse, including a porter Sudhakaran (Vinayakan), auto driver Sathyan (Sreejith Ravi) and a one leg cripple (J Kutty). Angered by the suicide of a student who is mocked and refused a loan for her studies, they eventually kill the corrupt bank manager who abetted it. Soon enough more corrupt individuals are killed by the group, and Rajan Mathew is reinstated as S.P. to nab the group. The team learn about Rajan's reinstatement, and decide to kidnap him, building trust with his wife through their ally Kamini (Surabhi Lakshmi).

Rajan's investigation leads to a powerful kingmaker and minister Paramasivam (Vincent Asokan)  who controls the media and political parties. Rajan videotapes conversations between Paramasivam, godman Harihar ji and other tycoons to expose them. But his superiors being corrupt, he is sold out, and soon is attacked for the videotape, his pregnant wife is murdered, and Rajan is crippled, with the videotape lost. He is now transferred as Jail Superintendent where the remaining three of the 4 the people team are incarcerated. Rajan realises that the system is corrupt and his own superiors betrayed him. 

Four students of By the people lead an attack on Paramasivam at his vacation house, with the idea of bombing it when he arrives, but they are trapped and get killed. Rajan learns of this, and soon joins hands with By the people, to fight corruption and avenge themselves. The first victim is inspector Thomas, Rajan's corrupt superior, who is killed when a roller coaster he inaugurates goes off track, being rigged by the team. 

In comes investigating officer Balan Nambiar, who soon arrives at the doors of By the people and their prime advisor Rajan Mathew, following the clues left by trails of their deeds, but with no evidence against them. He figures that the next victims will be Hariharji and Paramasivam, and tries to protect them. Soon enough, Hariharji is killed by the team at a resort. The video tape is incidentally found by a Junkyard owner, who hands it over to the media. It is publicized but the court does not accept it as evidence and Paramasivam is acquitted. 

The team then plots to eliminate Paramasivam at a rally, in a staged manner with backup from everyone. Unfortunately Kamini is nabbed while trying to bomb the minister, followed by the cripple, Sathyan, Sudhakaran and others who are either killed or nabbed by Balan. Despite warning, Paramasivam continues with the rally till it reaches a Portugal cultural festival event. Rajan then hurriedly releases the incarcerated 4 the people team, Arvind Sebastian (Arun), Eshwar (Arjun Bose) and Shafeek (Padma Kumar) who arrive incognito at the venue and assassinate Paramasivam point blank and break away. Balan pursues them but finds them lodged behind bars, with no evidence that they had ever left the cells. He commends Rajan for his clever tactics in annihilating the members of the caucus and leaving no trace of the act, bidding him 'Hasta la vista', the punch line of the band Pulse.

Cast 

 Narain as Rajan Mathew IPS (credited as Sunil)
Mangala as Malli Makam
Sreejith Ravi as Sathyan 
Vinayakan as Sudhakaran
J Kutty as Pulse/By the people team member
Satheesh Poduval as Balan Nambiar
Surabhi Lakshmi as Kamini
Arun as Aravind Sebastian
Arjun Bose as Eeswar Iyyer
Padmakumar as Shafeek 
Vincent Asokan as Paramasivam
Jaya  
Krishnan Potti as Harihar ji
 M.B. Raja
 Gangatharan
 Mathew 
Kaithapram Santhosh- By the people team member 
Samad - By the people team member
Nishchal - By the people team member
Binoy - By the people team member
Pallavi Krishna
Sravana

Production 
After the success of 4 the People, Jayaraj started work on this film. Actor Sunil was cast in the lead.

Soundtrack 
The music is by Pravin Mani and all the songs have been sung by and featured on Tamil pop band S5, comprising Anaitha Nair, Benny Dayal, Suvi Suresh, Bhargavi Pillai and Arjun Sashi. The Tamil hit single "Malarey" features as a Malayalam song.

Box office
The film was a box office failure and the director's fourth consecutive failure. The film's failure is attributed to Jayaraj "half-heartedly" trying to "rework" the "magic" of 4 the People with this film. Jayaraj called the film a "failed experiment".

References

2005 films
2000s Malayalam-language films
People2
Indian sequel films
Indian vigilante films